Chrastava is a town in Liberec District in the Liberec Region of the Czech Republic. It has about 6,300 inhabitants.

Administrative parts
Chrastava is made up of town parts of Chrastava, Dolní Chrastava and Horní Chrastava, and of villages of Andělská Hora, Dolní Vítkov, Horní Vítkov, Víska and Vysoká.

Geography
On the north, the municipal territory borders Germany. It lies mostly in the Zittau Basin, but it also extends into the Jizera Mountains on the north and to the Ještěd–Kozákov Ridge on the south. The town is situated at the confluence of the rivers Lusatian Neisse and Jeřice.

History

The first written mention of Chrastava is from 1352 as Cratzauia, already referred to as quite big settlement. It was founded probably at the end of the 13th century by German settlers, having been invited by King Ottokar II of Bohemia. They came mainly from the town of Pirna in Saxony and began to mine metals in the vicinity of Chrastava, in particularly copper, tin, lead, iron and silver.

Chrastava, then known mostly by the German name Kratzau, was occupied by the Hussites who use the town as a base for expeditions into Lusatia during the Hussite Wars. In 1433, the local castle and the whole town was conquered and damaged. This caused general decline, departure of population and stagnation of trade, which lasted for several decades.

In the 16th and 17th centuries, ore mining in Chrastava declined, when most of the reserves had already been mined. The population therefore gradually reoriented to the textile industry. The first large textile factory was built in 1815. In 1859, the railway was built.

Chrastava became part of Czechoslovakia after the collapse of Austria-Hungary from World War I. The town was almost entirely ethnic German, however, and was ceded to Nazi Germany along with the rest of the Sudetenland after the Munich Agreement in 1938.

In 1943, during World War II, two forced labor camps were set up in the area by Organization Schmelt. These camps provided workers for the Tannwald Textile Works and an ammunition factory (Deutsche Industriewerke AG) that produced hand grenades and other military material for the armed forces of Germany. The camps became subcamps of Gross-Rosen in October 1944. Female prisoners were transported to Kratzau from Auschwitz, as well as from other Gross-Rosen subcamps that were being evacuated. By then the subcamps included Polish, Czech, French, Belgian, Dutch and Danish women. 

As more women arrived from the evacuated Gross-Rosen subcamps conditions at Kratzau worsened. Zenon Lis, who was a child at the time, has said the food at Kratzau was "poor and varied at different times: black coffee, dry bread, rutabaga soup, a potato on rare occasions, and a piece of liverwurst on exceptional ones". Joseph Mengele is known to have visited Kratzau three times between October 1944 and March 1945 to conduct a "selection"; after each of these visits the selected women were sent to a subcamp in Zittau.

After the German population was expelled in 1945–1947, Chrastava was resettled mainly by Czechs.

Demographics

Economy
The largest employed with its headquarters in the town is a branch of the Benteler International company, focused on the production of automotive parts. The factory was built in 1999 and employs about 600 people.

Transport
Chrastava lies on the railway line Liberec–Zittau–Varnsdorf.

Sights

The landmark of Chrastava is the Church of Saint Lawrence. It was originally a wooden church from the 14th century. A massive stone tower was added at the end of the 16th century. The church was rebuilt into its current pseudo-Gothic form in 1866–1868. The baroque rectory next to the church dates from 1739.

Notable people
Leopold Alois Hoffmann (1760–1806), Austrian writer
Joseph von Führich (1800–1876), Austrian painter
Wilhelm Kandler (1816–1896), German Bohemian painter
Theodor Körner (1873–1957), Austrian politician, President of Austria in 1951–1957; grew up here
Willi Sitte (1921–2013), German painter

Twin towns – sister cities

Chrastava is twinned with:
 Eichstätt, Germany
 Lwówek Śląski, Poland

References

External links

Virtual show

 
Cities and towns in the Czech Republic
Populated places in Liberec District
Holocaust locations in Czechoslovakia